Camborne and Redruth is a constituency in Cornwall represented in the House of Commons of the UK Parliament since its creation for the 2010 general election by George Eustice, a Conservative who served as Environment Secretary between 2020 and 2022 under Prime Minister Boris Johnson. The seat is on the South West Peninsula of England, bordered by both the Celtic Sea to the northwest and English Channel to the southeast.

History
The constituency was created for the 2010 UK general election, primarily as the successor to Falmouth and Camborne, following a review of parliamentary representation in Cornwall by the Boundary Commission which increased the number of seats in the county from five to six.

Constituency profile

This is a large rural seat spanning both coasts of Cornwall where the Conservatives are strongest, but also the former mining towns of Hayle, Camborne and Redruth which are more Labour-leaning. Residents are less wealthy than the UK average.

Boundaries 
The District of Kerrier wards of Camborne North, Camborne South, Camborne West, Constantine, Gweek and Mawnan, Illogan North, Illogan South, Mabe and Budock, Redruth North, Redruth South, St Day, Lanner and Carharrack, Stithians, and Wendron, the District of Penwith wards of Gwinear, Gwithian and Hayle East, Hayle North, and Hayle South, and the District of Carrick ward of Mount Hawke.

In addition to the towns of Camborne and Redruth, which were both previously in the Falmouth and Camborne seat, this seat has the village of Mount Hawke from the former Truro and St Austell seat and the western town of Hayle, transferred from the St Ives seat.

Members of Parliament

Elections

Elections in the 2010s

* Served as the MP for Falmouth and Camborne from 2005, until its abolition in 2010

See also 
List of parliamentary constituencies in Cornwall
List of constituencies in South West England

Notes

References

External links 
nomis Constituency Profile for Camborne and Redruth — presenting data from the ONS annual population survey and other official statistics.

Parliamentary constituencies in Cornwall
Constituencies of the Parliament of the United Kingdom established in 2010
Camborne
Redruth